Mazaak Mazaak Mein is an Indian Hindi reality television talent competition, which premiered on 23 July 2016 on Life OK. The series is produced by Balaji Telefilms of Ekta Kapoor and Shobha Kapoor.

Harbhajan Singh and Shoaib Akhtar were the judges.

Plot
The show is a reality show, but the main aim of the show is to select the best comedians in the field of comedy.

Judges
 Shoaib Akhtar
 Harbhajan Singh

Cast
 Chandan Prabhakar
 Raju Srivastava
Suresh Albela
 Vrajesh Hirjee
Zafri Khan

References

Balaji Telefilms television series
2016 Indian television series debuts
Hindi-language television shows
Indian comedy television series
Television shows set in Mumbai
Life OK original programming
2016 Indian television series endings
Indian stand-up comedy television series